Cucalón can refer to:

 Cucalón, Spain
Sierra de Cucalón mountain range
 Cucalón (comic strip)